Vulpoxena falcaria is a species of moth of the family Tortricidae. It is found in Morona-Santiago Province, Ecuador.

The wingspan is about 20 mm. The ground colour of the forewings is cream, tinged with brownish and ochreous and distinctly suffused with brown in the dorsobasal area and the basal area. The markings are brown. The hindwings are cream, mixed with ochreous at the apex.

Etymology
The species name refers to the shape of the terminal part of the aedeagus and is derived from Latin falx (meaning sickle) and arius (an adjective appendix).

References

Moths described in 2008
Euliini
Moths of South America
Taxa named by Józef Razowski